Erik Kuselias is an Emmy award winning television and radio personality and host who currently works for CBS Sports, where he hosts “Sportsline” (the network’s show on sports wagering) and CBS Sports HQ.

A MENSA member, Kuselias is known for his high intellect, pop culture humor and fast paced energetic hosting style. He is one of the nation’s leading fantasy football and sports wagering experts.

Education/Upbringing 
Kuselias was born (and currently resides) in Hamden, CT. He attended Hamden High School where he was a quarterback and two-time all state baseball player. He was recruited to play both sports and attended Brown University, where he double majored with honors. After college, Kuselias attended the University of Michigan Law school. After law school, Kuselias was admitted to Columbia University’s school of Journalism, where he received his masters and did his PhD studies.

Career
In 2003 while he was practicing law, Kuselias and his brother started a sports talk show “The Sports Brothers” that aired for one hour per week. Later that year, Kuselias was hired by ESPN and “The Sports Brothers” became ESPN’s national afternoon drive time program.  In 2005 the show was rebranded “The Erik Kuselias show” and became the fastest growing sports talk radio show in the nation, ultimately reaching over 400 stations.

In 2007, ESPN tapped Kuselias to host its new daily tv show, NASCAR Now, which was nominated for an Emmy for “Best studio show” that year. However, in 2008, Kuselias left NASCAR Now and he created and starred in “Fantasy Football Now” which won an Emmy in Kuselias’s first year. Additionally, he went back to radio full time and appeared on a variety of ESPN TV programs including “Mike and Mike in the Morning”, “College Football Live”, “NFL Live” and “SportsCenter”.

In 2011, Kuselias left ESPN to join “Golf Channel” where he started and hosted “Morning Drive”. In 2012, he was promoted up to NBC Sports where he hosted "ProFootball Talk" with Mike Florio; and "Fantasy Football Talk". On August 4, 2012, NBC announced that it was launching the NBC Sports Radio network, and its flagship morning show would be the “Erik Kuselias Show”. Kuselias did TV and radio at NBC until 2016 when he partnered with Genesis Communications to broadcast “The Erik Kuselias show” on radio.

In 2018, Kuselias was hired by CBS Sports, where he currently works.

Personal life
Kuselias is 6’ 1” and a fitness enthusiast. From 2001 to 2010 he was married to Kristen Kuselias. In 2011, Kuselias began a 7 year relationship with TV Host/fitness model Holly Sonders that ended in divorce in 2016.  Kuselias has two sons (Erik  and Troy)

References

National Hockey League broadcasters
American radio personalities
Brown University alumni
University of Michigan Law School alumni
Year of birth missing (living people)
Living people
Connecticut lawyers
People from Hamden, Connecticut
College football announcers
National Football League announcers
Golf writers and broadcasters
Mensans